Sven Otto "Sleven" Säfwenberg (21 May 1898 in Uppsala – 15 January 1950 in Gävle) was a Swedish bandy goaltender.

Säfwenberg underwent education in Påhlmans Handelsinstitut, Stockholm, in 1923 and had various jobs in the sports equipment industry in Germany, Czechoslovakia, and Sweden from 1920 to 1927. In 1927 he started his own business producing and selling bandy sticks and balls.

Sven Säfwenberg played in two clubs, IK Sirius and IFK Uppsala. Sune Almkvist persuaded him to choose IFK Uppsala, where he took over the goalkeeper spot for Seth Howander, which instead became a right defencemen. Säfwenberg won seven Swedish championships in bandy, the first in 1915, and about 500 prizes in athletics, swimming, football, bandy, and sailing.

Säfwenber earned the Svenska Dagbladet Gold Medal in 1933. This is still the only awarded medal in bandy.

Sven Säfwenberg was also awarded the Stora Grabbars Märke in bandy with number 1.

He played one match for Sweden's national team in ice hockey in 1921 and became European Champion.

Sven Säfwenberg was brother of David Säfwenberg.

References
1898 års män i ord och bild 1898–1948: en bokfilm 1898–1948 och ett biografiskt lexikon, (in Swedish) edited by Ph.D. H Granvik, curator Nils Olsson, Carl Wahlstedt, K G Lindeström, Svenska Kulturförlaget, Stenström & Bartelson, Malmö 1948 page 765
Sveriges dödbok 1947–2003, (CD-ROM version 3.0), edited by Sveriges Släktforskarförbund, SSf, 2005

1898 births
Sportspeople from Uppsala
1950 deaths
Swedish ice hockey players
Swedish bandy players
IK Sirius players
IFK Uppsala Bandy players